Charcoal is a sans-serif typeface designed by David Berlow of Font Bureau during the period 1994–1997. Charcoal was the default menu font in Apple Computer's Mac OS 8 and 9, replacing the relatively harder-to-read Chicago as part of the new Platinum interface. In Mac OS X developer preview 3, it was replaced with Lucida Grande as the system typeface. Charcoal is designed for high legibility, even at smaller point sizes, displayed on computer monitors. 

While similar in design to grotesque sans-serifs, Charcoal has a distinctive organic quality. The letterforms have a high x-height, a vertical axis, and maintain generous counter-form in and around the letterforms. Descending characters, g, j, p, q, and y are shallow, compensating for the high x-height, and allowing for reduced leading in text. While designed primarily for monitor display, Charcoal has had considerable popularity in print, including in letterpress printing. 

Virtue is a free TrueType font of similar design sometimes used as a surrogate on non-Apple systems.

Truth
Truth, an expanded Charcoal family, is sold by Font Bureau, designed by David Berlow, and was released in 2005. It contains small differences from Charcoal, and is available in seven weights: Thin, Light, Regular, Medium, Bold, Black, and Ultra.

References

External links

New Fonts: FB Truth and Minah
Truth FB Truth
Online showing and comparisons
Letterpress printing with the Charcoal typeface

Font Bureau typefaces
Sans-serif typefaces
Apple Inc. typefaces
Typefaces and fonts introduced in 1995
Typefaces designed by David Berlow